Caféine is the second album from French singer Christophe Willem. It was released on 25 May 2009 by Columbia. The lead single is "Berlin" and was released for download on 28 March 2009.

Background 
Mid-2008, Christophe Willem confirmed the recording of his second studio album, which will be released on April 16, 2009, two years to the day after his first album.  Rumours say the album would have an electronic-oriented sound and produce by Minogue's producers.  On October 31, Christophe-willem.com announced the possibility that the album would contain a duet with Kylie Minogue on the track called "Sensitized". The title "Caféine" was made official on February 6, 2009, but other rumours appeared. The first said Jennifer Ayache, singer from French rock-band Superbus, gave Willem a song named "Dansez". The singer will confirm the rumours later. The second is about a French adaptation from "State of Grace" by Britney Spears, a leftover song from the Blackout recording sessions.  In some interviews, Willem makes his duet with Kylie Minogue known, the track is produced by Guy Chambers just like "Heartbox". It's already available on X published in 2007. However, Christophe translated into French some parts of the song.  "Dansez" is finally called "Tu Te Fous De Nous" and "Entre Nous Et Le Sol" is a French adaptation of "State Of Grace"

Track listings

Editions Standard & Deluxe Collector 
 "Ouverture" - 0:39
 "L'homme En Noir" - 4:30
 "Sensitized" duet with Kylie Minogue - 3:46
 "Berlin" - 3:13
 "La Demande" - 3:39
 "Entre Nous Et Le Sol" - 3:58
 "Plus Que Tout" - 4:44
 "Coffee" - 3:40
 "Fragile" - 3:26
 "Trash" duet with Skye - 3:57
 "Tu Te Fous De Nous" - 4:35
 "Heartbox" - 3:53
 "Yaourt & Lavabo"
 "Si Je Tombais" (Acoustic) - 4:58

Edition Deluxe Collector 
 "Holé Holé" (Original version of « L'homme En Noir ») - 4:37
 "Berlin" (Alternative Version) - 3:08
 "La Demande" (Remix) - 4:13
 "Si Je Tombais" - 4:28
 "Walk Away" duet with Skye 2:28

Charts and sales

Weekly charts

Year-end charts

Certifications

References 

Christophe Willem albums
2009 albums
Columbia Records albums